Connell Maynor (born January 21, 1969) is an American football coach and former player. He is the head football coach at Alabama A&M University . Maynor previously served in the same capacity at Hampton University from 2013 to 2017 and Winston-Salem State University (WSSU) from 2010 to 2013. During his tenure at Winston-Salem State, the Rams won two Central Intercollegiate Athletic Association (CIAA) championships and advanced to the NCAA Division II Football Championship title game in 2012. He also played in the Arena Football League (AFL) from 1996 to 2006.

Head coaching record

References

External links
 Alabama A&M profile
 Hampton profile

1969 births
Living people
Alabama A&M Bulldogs football coaches
American football quarterbacks
Philadelphia Soul coaches
Carolina Cobras players
Fayetteville State Broncos football coaches
Hampton Pirates football coaches
New Jersey Gladiators players
New York CityHawks players
North Carolina A&T Aggies football players
Orlando Predators players
Philadelphia Soul players
Tampa Bay Storm players
Winston-Salem State Rams football coaches
Winston-Salem State Rams football players
Sportspeople from Fayetteville, North Carolina
Players of American football from North Carolina
African-American coaches of American football
African-American players of American football
20th-century African-American sportspeople
21st-century African-American sportspeople